East Spanish Peak is a prominent mountain summit that is the lower of the two Spanish Peaks in the Rocky Mountains of North America. The Spanish Peaks are two large igneous stocks which form an eastern outlier of the Culebra Range, a subrange of the Sangre de Cristo Mountains.

Geology
East Spanish Peak is the younger of the two Spanish Peaks stocks and was intruded 23.36 +/- 0.18 million years ago.  The stock consists of a granite porphyry core surrounded by granodiorite porphyry.  It is likely that the granite porphyry represents the upper portion of the magma chamber, the top of which eroded to expose at the summit the less-evolved larger portion of the magma chamber consisting of granodiorite porphyry.

Hiking/climbing
The standard ascent route for East Spanish Peak ascends the west ridge of the peak from the saddle between it and West Spanish Peak. A trail ascends to the saddle from the north side of the peaks.

See also

List of Colorado mountain ranges
List of Colorado mountain summits
List of Colorado fourteeners
List of Colorado 4000 meter prominent summits
List of the most prominent summits of Colorado
List of Colorado county high points

References

External links

Mountains of Colorado
Mountains of Huerfano County, Colorado
Mountains of Las Animas County, Colorado
San Isabel National Forest
Sangre de Cristo Mountains
North American 3000 m summits